Warner TV is a pay television channel mainly airing in Latin America, Europe, parts of South Asia and Southeast Asia, which is owned by Warner Bros. Discovery through its International unit that focuses on airing American series and films.

Most programming air in their original English audio, with subtitles in Spanish (for Latin American countries and Spain except Brazil), Portuguese (for Brazil), Chinese (for Taiwan, Hong Kong, and Singapore),  Malaysian (for Malaysia) and Indonesian (for Indonesia), however, there are also some dubbed programming. On November 1, 2015, the Latin American channel changed it to dub a programming instead of just subtitling them. This caused an uproar to most of its audience.

Warner TV's headquarters are located in Brazil, Colombia, Chile, Singapore, and Malaysia; the broadcasting, however, is based in Miami for Latin American viewers and Singapore for Asian viewers. On November 9, 2017, Turner Broadcasting System France and Canal+ both launched Warner TV in France, replacing Syfy which became a SFR exclusive.

The channel's catalogue, for its entirety, is sourced from the library of Warner Bros., which licensed its name to the channel until 2019.

In March 2015, the Filipino feed separated from the Southeast Asian Warner TV channel to air a different programming schedule, including selected programming from truTV.

On April 22, 2020, the French version launched in Sub-Saharan Africa in StarTimes.

On May 2, 2020, Warner TV began broadcasting the Adult Swim programming block in Latin America and Brazil, which initially included Rick and Morty, Final Space, Robot Chicken, and Aqua Teen Hunger Force. On May 3, 2021, Metalocalypse and The Shivering Truth were added to the Adult Swim programming block. On November 8, 2021, Adult Swim was pulled from Warner TV's lineup.

On June 14, 2021, it was announced that the TNT channels in Germany would be rebranded into Warner TV from September 25, 2021.

On July 8, 2021, it was announced that TNT in Poland and Romania would rebrand into Warner TV from October 23, 2021.

In October 2022, it was announced that a Warner TV channel would be launched in Italy by October 30 of the same year. However unlike other Warner TV channels, this one will be operating as a free to air channel on Italian DTT.

On February 27, 2023 it was announced that TNT in Spain would be rebranded as Warner TV on April 14, 2023.

Programming 
Shows marked with a parenthesis after the title are Southeast-Asia-only programs unless otherwise noted.

2016 
 DC's Legends of Tomorrow
 Supergirl
 Lethal Weapon (Southeast Asia)
 Angie Tribeca (Southeast Asia)
 Good Behavior (Southeast Asia)

2015 
 Blindspot
 iZombie
 Public Morals (Southeast Asia)

2014 
 The 100 (except for the Philippines viewers)
 Believe
 The Flash
 Gotham 
 Ground Floor
 Selfie (Southeast Asia)
 Surviving Jack
 The Last Ship (Southeast Asia)
 Undateable

2013 
 Almost Human
 Hostages
 Major Crimes (Southeast Asia)
 Mom
 Super Fun Night
 The Originals (Except Brazil, where it is shown by MTV)

2012 
 Are You There, Chelsea?
 Arrow
 Dallas
 Go On
 I Hate My Teenage Daughter
 Southland (Southeast Asia)

2011 
 2 Broke Girls
 Harry's Law
 Person of Interest
 The Secret Circle
 Suburgatory

2010 
 Better with You
 Chase
 Human Target
 Nikita
 Men of a Certain Age
 The Middle 
 Mike & Molly
 Pretty Little Liars
 $#*! My Dad Says
 V

2009 
 Fringe 
 Knight Rider
 Trauma
 The Vampire Diaries

2008 
 Aliens in America
 Big Shots
 Eleventh Hour
 The Ellen DeGeneres Show
 Flashpoint
 The Mentalist
 The New Adventures of Old Christine
 Privileged
 Pushing Daisies
 Terminator: The Sarah Connor Chronicles

2007 
 The Big Bang Theory
 Californication
 Cane
 Chuck
 Gossip Girl
 Moonlight
 Notes from the Underbelly
 Pussycat Dolls Present
 Studio 60 on the Sunset Strip
 Traveler

2006 
 Blade: The Series
 The Class
 The Evidence
 Invasion
 Men in Trees
 The Nine
 Smith

2005 
 The Bachelorette
 Freddie
 Hot Properties
 Joey
 Kevin Hill
 The L Word
 Related
 Reunion
 Supernatural (scheduled to end in 2021)
 The Swan

Others 
 Cold Case (currently airing)
 Complete Savages
 Deep in the City
 ER (currently airing)
 Everwood
 Fastlane
 Four Kings
 The Fresh Prince of Bel-Air
 Friends (currently airing)
 Full House
 Gilmore Girls
 Jack & Jill
 Jesse
 Modern Men
 The O.C.
 Smallville
 Step by Step
 Thick and Thin
 Third Watch
 Two and a Half Men 
 Veronica's Closet
 What I Like About You
 The West Wing
 Without a Trace

References

External links 
 Official Website (Spanish and  Portuguese)
 Official Website (French)

 
Warner Bros. Discovery networks
Spanish-language television stations
Portuguese-language television stations in Brazil
Chinese-language television stations
English-language television stations
French-language television stations
Italian-language television stations
Latin American cable television networks
Television networks in Brazil
Television networks in China
Mass media in Southeast Asia
Television networks in France
Television channels in Italy
Television channels and stations established in 1995